KKXA (1520 AM "Classic Country KXA") is a commercial radio station licensed to Snohomish, Washington and serving the Seattle metropolitan area.  The station's broadcast license is held by CAAM Partnership, LLC., an entity controlled by the Skotdal family, which also publishes the Everett Post newspaper.  The KKXA studios are shared with sister station AM 1380 KRKO at the Key Tower building in downtown Everett, Washington.  The transmitter is off Short School Road (115th Avenue SE) in Snohomish.  KKXA airs a classic country radio format.

Broadcast Signals
KKXA is licensed to broadcast a digital hybrid HD signal.  KKXA broadcasts at the maximum power for commercial AM stations, 50,000 watts around the clock.  By day, it uses a non-directional antenna.  But during night, KKXA uses a directional antenna.  Because 1520 kHz is a clear channel frequency, KKXA must avoid interfering with KOKC in Oklahoma City and WWKB in Buffalo, New York, the Class A stations on the frequency.

KKXA also broadcasts on a 250 watt FM translator, K266CJ at 101.1 FM.

Programming
KKXA broadcasts classic country music, branded as "Classic Country KXA." In addition to its music programming, KKXA is an affiliate of the Washington State University Cougar football and basketball network, and also carries Western Conference high school football and basketball.  Occasional Everett AquaSox baseball (Seattle Mariners affiliate) and Everett Silvertips hockey games are also aired on KKXA.

History

Building the station
In January 2004, the Skotdal family applied to the Federal Communications Commission (FCC) for a construction permit for a new broadcast radio station. The FCC granted this permit on March 16, 2011, with a scheduled expiration date of March 16, 2014. The Skotdal family won a comparative hearing before the Federal Communications Commission against mutually exclusive applicants hoping to place the signal in Hawaii, Whidbey Island, and on the Olympic Peninsula. The station was assigned the call sign "KKXA" by the Federal Communications Commission (FCC) on March 28, 2011.

Known on-air as "KXA" as a tribute to pioneering radio station KXA (770 AM), the station began airing a loop of test audio in August 2011. KKXA broadcasts to the greater Seattle metropolitan area. On October 11, 2011, KKXA began regular broadcasting at 4:00 pm with a classic country format branded as "Classic Country 1520 KXA".  The first song was "Simple Man" by Charlie Daniels. The station received its broadcast license on November 4, 2011.

Stitch Mitchell has been doing the morning show since the Classic Country format began in 2011. Stitch was previously with KBSG/Seattle, B-87/Portland, and KMZQ/Las Vegas.

Digital (HD) Broadcasting
On October 4 and 5, 2014, KKXA was the only radio station in North America broadcasting a 100% digital signal during historic tests for NAB Labs, a division of the National Association of Broadcasters.  KKXA suspended analog transmissions for four hours on Saturday and eight hours on Sunday for nighttime and daytime tests, respectively.  KKXA was the third commercial AM station in North America to test all-digital daytime transmissions. KKXA currently broadcasts using HD Radio technology alongside its analog signal.

Translator

References

External links

KKXA on RadioMixer

HD Radio stations
Classic country radio stations in the United States
Radio stations established in 2011
KXA
Snohomish, Washington
Mass media in Snohomish County, Washington
2011 establishments in Washington (state)